Dielectric reluctance is a scalar measurement of a passive dielectric circuit (or element within that circuit) dependent on voltage and electric induction flux, and this is determined by deriving the ratio of their amplitudes. The units of dielectric reluctance are F−1 (inverse farads—see daraf) [Ref. 1-3].

As seen above, dielectric reluctance is represented as lowercase z epsilon.
    
For a dielectric in a dielectric circuit to have no energy losses, the imaginary part of its dielectric reluctance is zero. This constitutes a lossless "resistance" to electric induction flux, and is therefore real, not complex. This formality is similar to Ohm's Law for a resistive circuit. In dielectric circuits, a dielectric material has a "lossless" dielectric reluctance equal to:

Where:
 is the circuit length
 is the cross-section of the circuit element
 is the dielectric permeability

See also

Dielectric
Dielectric complex reluctance — General definition of dielectric reluctance that accounts for energy loss

References

 Hippel A. R., Dielectrics and Waves. New York: John Wiley, 1954.
 Popov V. P.,  The Principles of Theory of Circuits. – M.: Higher School, 1985, 496 p. (In Russian).
 Küpfmüller K. Einführung in die theoretische Elektrotechnik, Springer-Verlag, 1959.

Electric and magnetic fields in matter